This is a list of active and extinct volcanoes in Tonga.

References
  See especially Figure 1.
 Global Volcanism Program (GVP)
 D. Stanley; South Pacific handbook
 Government of Tonga, official 1962 land survey

Tonga
 
Volcanoes